Buller, Ontario may refer to:
Buller, Haliburton County, Ontario
Buller, Hastings County, Ontario